Barry Smith (born 4 June 1952) is an academic working in the fields of ontology and biomedical informatics. Smith is the author of more than 700 scientific publications, including 15 authored or edited books, and he is one of the most widely cited contemporary philosophers.

Education and career
From 1970 to 1973 Smith studied Mathematics and Philosophy at the University of Oxford. He obtained his PhD from the University of Manchester in 1976 for a dissertation on ontology and reference in Husserl and Frege. The dissertation was supervised by Wolfe Mays.

Among the cohort of graduate students supervised by Mays in Manchester were Kevin Mulligan (Geneva/Lugano), and Peter Simons (Trinity College, Dublin). Both shared with Smith an interest in analytic metaphysics and in the contributions of turn-of-the-century Continental philosophers and logicians to central issues of analytic philosophy. In 1979 Mulligan, Simons and Smith together founded the Seminar for Austro-German Philosophy, which organized workshops and conferences centered around the work of early Central European philosophers from Bolzano to Tarski and their impact on subsequent generations. A central role in this respect was played by Husserl's contributions to formal ontology. One prominent supporter of these meetings was Roderick Chisholm, who in his Intellectual Autobiography published in 1997 describes the 'significant role' played by these meetings in contemporary philosophy.

From 1976 to 1994 Smith held appointments at the University of Sheffield (1976–1979), the University of Manchester (1979–1989) and the International Academy of Philosophy, Liechtenstein (1989–1994). In 1994 he moved to the University at Buffalo (New York, USA), where he is currently Julian Park Distinguished Professor of Philosophy and Affiliate Professor of Biomedical Informatics, Computer Science and Engineering, and Neurology. From 2002 to 2006 Smith served as founding Director of the Institute for Formal Ontology and Medical Information Science (IFOMIS), initially in Leipzig and then, from 2004, in Saarbrücken.

In 2005 Smith founded the National Center for Ontological Research (NCOR), under the auspices of which he initiated in 2006 the Ontology for the Intelligence Community, subsequently STIDS, conference series, and also the International Conference on Biomedical Ontology (ICBO).

From 1992 to 2016 Smith served as editor of  The Monist: An International Quarterly Journal of General Philosophical Inquiry.

From 2016 he served as editor of international standard ISO/IEC 21838: Top Level Ontologies, Parts 1 and 2, which were published by ISO in 2021. Part 1  specifies the requirements for being a top-level (which means: domain-neutral) ontology. Part 2 is devoted to Basic Formal Ontology (BFO). In September 2022 the Frankfurter Allgemeine Zeitung pointed to the fact that BFO is the first example of a piece of philosophy that has been elevated to the status of an industrial norm, describing this as a 'small sensation in the history of science'.

Since 2019 Smith has served as Visiting Professor at the University of Italian Switzerland.

Research activities
From the beginning of his career Smith has worked in the field of ontology, initially on the history of ontology as a sub-discipline of philosophy in the tradition of Brentano, Husserl, Reinach and Ingarden. A special focus was on the theory of ontological dependence and part-whole relations proposed by Husserl, a theory which was applied by Husserl's students for example to the understanding of the ontology of mental and linguistic acts. In 1984 he published together with Mulligan and Simons the paper "Truth-Makers". This paper helped to launch truthmaker theory,  a still active research program at the borderlines of logic, semantics and philosophical ontology that is based on a new understanding of the correspondence theory of truth.

In the 1990s Smith worked closely with David Mark, one of the founders of geographic information science (GIS), on initiatives in the field of geospatial ontology. In this connection he introduced the idea of fiat objects to describe (often rectangular) geospatial entities, such as postal districts and real estate parcels, which are not separated from their surroundings by any physical discontinuity. This terminology has established itself in the GIS community, and it has also been generalized into other fields.

Since 2000 much of Smith's research has been centered on the application of ontology in biomedical informatics, where he has worked on a variety of projects relating to biomedical terminologies and electronic health records. He is a founding Coordinating Editor of the OBO Foundry and has served as a member of the Scientific Advisory Board of the Gene Ontology (GO) Consortium and of the Ontology for Biomedical Investigations (OBI). He contributes to the development of a number of biological and biomedical ontologies, including the Protein Ontology, the Plant Ontology, and others. Between 2005 and 2015 he was a co-PI of the NIH National Center for Biomedical Ontology, where he was responsible especially for dissemination of ontology best practices and for providing training opportunities for biomedical ontologists. Between 2013 and 2018 he served as ontology lead on the NIAID ImmPort project.

Smith works also on the ontology of social reality, particularly in connection with the work of John Searle. He serves as consultant to Hernando de Soto, Director of the Institute for Liberty and Democracy in Peru, on projects relating to the advancement of property and business rights among the poor in developing countries.

Since 2008 Smith has worked on ontology initiatives in the military and intelligence field. In 2008–2010 he served as technical lead on a project sponsored by the US Army Net-Centric Data Strategy Center of Excellence (ANCDS CoE) to create the Universal Core Semantic Layer (UCore-SL). Since 2010 he was worked on a series of initiatives sponsored by the US Army Intelligence and Information Warfare Directorate (I2WD) to create a framework for semantic enhancement of intelligence data in the Cloud. Since 2014 he is collaborator on initiatives of the US Air Force Research Laboratory on planning, mission assurance, and lifecycle management. In this connection he has worked on the creation of an ontology for joint military doctrine, designed to support the use of information technology in joint operations by allowing computational access to the contents of Joint Doctrine publications. He has also contributed to the ecosystem of Space Domain Ontologies created under the direction of CUBRC in Buffalo, and he is one of the founding members of the Department of Defense and Intelligence Community Ontology Working Group (DIOWG).

Since 2016 Smith has been centrally involved in the Industrial Ontologies Foundry (IOF) initiative, which is creating a set of open ontologies to support the data needs of the manufacturing and engineering industries in a way that will advance data interoperability. Basic Formal Ontology, which serves as the top-level hub of the IOF, has been applied in the development of ontologies in many areas of engineering, including maintenance, supply chain, product life cycle, and additive manufacturing.

In 2022 Smith published with the German scientist Jobst Landgrebe Why Machines Will Never Rule the World. Artificial Intelligence Without Fear.<ref>Jobst Landgrebe and Barry Smith, Why Humans Will Never Rule the World. Artificial Intelligence Without Fear, Abingdon, UK: Routledge, 2022, ISBN 978-1-00-331010-5.</ref> The book defends the thesis that there are strict limits to what AI can achieve. For stochastic AI, the limits rest on the fact that, for a stochastic algorithm to work requires training data which are representative of the data in the target domain. Training data which satisfy this requirement can be achieved in relation to simple systems. Where complex systems are involved, however, as is the case for all systems involving organisms, features of the target domain are always changing in unforeseeable ways, and each such change has the potential to deprive the training data of its representativeness. For deterministic AI, the problems are similar, because there the models require very strict regularities of a sort which we do not generally find in complex systems.

Recognition
1999 Fellow of the American Philosophical Society
2002 Wolfgang Paul Award, Alexander von Humboldt Foundation
2010 First Paolo Bozzi Prize for Ontology, University of Turin
2014 Fellow of the American College of Medical Informatics (FACMI)

Leo Zaibert's The Theory and Practice of Ontology (2016) and Gloria Zúñiga y Postigo and Gerald J. Erion's Barry Smith an sich (2017) are Festschrifts dedicated to Smith containing studies of his work by colleagues and students.

 Bibliography 

Publications by Barry Smith, Cosmos + Taxis 4 (4):67-104 (2017)
Kevin Mulligan, Peter Simons and Barry Smith, "What’s Wrong with Contemporary Philosophy?", Topoi, 25 (1-2), 2006, 63-67.

BooksStructure and Gestalt: Philosophy and Literature in Austria-Hungary and Her Successor States (ed.), 1981.
 Parts and Moments. Studies in Logic and Formal Ontology (ed.), Munich/Vienna: Philosophia, 1982.
 Foundations of Gestalt Theory (ed.), Munich/Vienna: Philosophia, 1988.
 Adolf Reinach, Sämtliche Werke. Kritische Ausgabe mit Kommentar, Band I: Die Werke, Teil I: Kritische Neuausgabe (1905–1914), Teil II: Nachgelassene Texte (1906–1917); Band II: Kommentar und Textkritik (ed. with Karl Schuhmann), Munich/Vienna: Philosophia 1989.
 Handbook of Metaphysics and Ontology, 2 vols. (ed. with Hans Burkhardt), Munich/Vienna: Philosophia, 1991.
 Austrian Philosophy: The Legacy of Franz Brentano, Chicago-LaSalle, Open Court, 1994.
 The Cambridge Companion to Husserl (ed., with David W. Smith), Cambridge/New York: Cambridge University Press, 1995.
 Rationality and Irrationality (ed., with Berit Brogaard), Vienna: öbv&hpt, 2001.
 Formal Ontology in Information Systems (ed., with Christopher Welty), New York: ACM Press, 2001.
 John Searle (ed.), Cambridge/New York: Cambridge University Press, 2003.
 Applied Ontology: An Introduction (ed. with K. Munn), 2008.
 The Mystery of Capital and the Construction of Social Reality (ed. with David Mark and Isaac Ehrlich), Chicago: Open Court, 2008.Biomedizinische Ontologie. Wissen strukturieren für den Informatik-Einsatz (ed. with Ludger Jansen), Zurich: vdf, 2008.Building Ontologies with Basic Formal Ontology, with Robert Arp and Andrew Spear, Cambridge, MA: MIT Press, 2015. Chinese translation, published by the Peking Medical Publishing House in October 2020.Why Machines Will Never Rule the World. Artificial Intelligence Without Fear'' (with Jobst Landgrebe), Abingdon, UK: Routledge, 2022, ISBN 978-1-00-331010-5.

References

External links
 Barry Smith's faculty page at the University at Buffalo
 National Center for Ontological Research
 WorldCat au:Barry Smith (1952)

Living people
1952 births
20th-century American philosophers
21st-century American philosophers
Academics of the University of Manchester
University at Buffalo faculty
Ontologists
British bioinformaticians
People from Bury, Greater Manchester
People educated at Bolton School